Charleston is a settlement in the Canadian province of Newfoundland and Labrador.

The population of Charleston as reported in the 1921 census was 114. In the 1935 census it was 124.

References

Populated places in Newfoundland and Labrador